Sergey Anatolyevich Petrov (born 1954, in Chkalov) is a russian politician and businessman who is the founder of the ROLF Group. From 2007 to 2016 — deputy of the State Duma of the V and VI convocations, he was a member of the political party Spravedlivaya Rossiya. In 2016, after the termination of his deputy powers, he returned to work in the Rolf Group of companies — he was Chairman of the Board of Directors of ROLF Group until 2019.

Biography

Sergey Petrov was born on August 16, 1954 in Chkalov (now Orenburg). After graduating from school in 1971 he entered The Higher Military Aviation School in Orenburg. 

In 1975 he achieved the rank of an officer and special qualification of a pilot-engineer. He worked as an instructor in the Military Aviation School in Orenburg.

In 1982 he was dismissed from the Soviet Army at the rank of Major and expelled from The Communist Party of the Soviet Union for anti-Soviet propaganda and participation in secret democratic organizations.

In 1982-1987, he received a second higher education at the Correspondence Institute of Soviet Trade (now the Plekhanov Russian University of Economics), majoring in labor economics.

In 1989-1991 he was the director of the car rental department at Rozek-Car.

In August 1991 he founded his own company ROLF Group.

In 2004 he resigned as the President of the Company and handed control over to employed managers. He was still responsible for ROLF's long-term development strategy.

On December 2, 2007 he was elected to the State Duma on the lists of the political party Spravedlivaya Rossiya. On December 4, 2011, he was re-elected as a deputy of the State Duma from the Spravedlivaya Rossiya, as a member of the State Duma of the V and IV convocations, he was a member of the Committee on Budget and Taxes. On October 5, 2016, he ended his term as a deputy of the State Duma of the VI convocation.

As a deputy of the State Duma, he voted against the adoption of the Dima Yakovlev Law and the adoption of the «Yarovaya Package», he is known for his critical statements against the Russian government. 

On June 27, 2019, police searches and seizures of documents were carried out in the offices of the ROLF Group. According to the press-office of the Investigative Committee, Sergey Petrov and a number of top-managers of the company are suspected under part 3 of Article 193.1 of the Criminal Code (committing currency transactions to transfer funds in foreign currency or the currency of the Russian Federation to the accounts of non-residents using forged documents) and allegedly illegally transferring 4 billion rubles to the accounts of one of the companies owned by Sergey Petrov. Sergey Petrov denied all the charges, calling the charges not consistent with the norms of law. Petrov linked the searches either to an attempt to raid the company, whose turnover in 2018 amounted to almost 230 billion rubles, or to political revenge for his position in the State Duma and support for the opposition. Sergey Petrov also said that he is not going to return to Russia in the near future. 

In July 2019, on his own initiative, he resigned from the Board of Directors of ROLF Group. 

On September 6, 2019, the Investigative Committee of the Russian Federation declared Petrov on the international wanted list in the case of the withdrawal of 4 billion rubles abroad.

In November 2019, Petrov announced his intention to sell the company ROLF and the formation of a closed list of applicants for the purchase of a car dealer.

As a result, the transaction did not take place.

Wealth

 51st place in Russian Forbes list, 2009; 
 50th place in «Vlast I Dengi» ("State and money") list, 2010;
 114-th place in «200 richest businessmen in Russia» in Russian FORBES list, 2019. The entrepreneur's fortune was estimated at $ 900 million.

Personal life

Married, has two children. Petrov is an alpine skier, a cyclist and a collector of Russian-Japanese War ship models.

He lives permanently in Austria.

Views on business in Russia

Political views

External links
Ведомости - Антисоветчик из группы «Рольф» (Russian)
Сергей Петров. Что может элита? (Russian)
Сергей Петров. Наш культурный код (Russian)
Сергей Петров. Мы любим самобытность. (Russian)
Сергей Петров: «Чиновники давно богаче олигархов» (Russian)

References

1954 births
Living people
A Just Russia politicians
21st-century Russian politicians
Russian businesspeople in transport
Russian billionaires
Fifth convocation members of the State Duma (Russian Federation)
Sixth convocation members of the State Duma (Russian Federation)
Automotive businesspeople